Albert William Watson (August 30, 1922 – September 25, 1994) was a Democrat-turned-Republican state and U.S. representative from South Carolina. He is best known for his losing 1970 campaign for governor, which has been described as the last high-profile, openly segregationist campaign.

Background
Albert William Watson was born in 1922 to Claude Watson, Sr. and his wife in Sumter in central South Carolina. His family moved and he was reared near the state capital of Columbia in Lexington County, where he attended public schools. He subsequently enrolled at the former North Greenville Junior College in Greenville, South Carolina. During World War II, Watson served as a weather specialist in the United States Army Air Forces.

In 1950, he graduated from the University of South Carolina School of Law and thereafter opened his legal practice in Columbia. In 1954, he was elected from Richland County to the South Carolina House of Representatives, which he served from 1955 to 1959 and again from 1961 to 1963.

In 1958, Watson lost the Democratic primary for lieutenant governor to Burnet Maybank, Jr., son of former U.S. Senator Burnet Maybank. In 1961, Watson returned to the state House for a final two-year term.

In 1948, Watson married the former Lillian Audrey Williams (born 1926), and the couple had three children, Laura L. Watson, Albert Watson, Jr., and Clark P. Watson. A Southern Baptist deacon, Watson had a twin brother, Allan R. Watson (1922-2001), who was a Baptist minister and served as the pastor of churches in Florida and Alabama. He preached at the White House in September 1969. A second brother, Claude Watson, Jr., of Columbia, died in 2003.

Congressional career
In 1962, Watson first ran for South Carolina's 2nd congressional district seat in the U.S. House to fill the opening created when fellow Democrat John J. Riley died on New Year's Day. His wife, Corinne Boyd Riley, had won a special election to serve out the remainder of the term, but did not run for a full term in November. After securing the Democratic nomination, Watson faced Floyd Spence, a fellow state representative from neighboring Lexington County, who had turned Republican a few months earlier. The ensuing general election was far closer than expected, with Watson winning by only five percentage points. He received crucial support from his mentor, U.S. Senator Strom Thurmond.

Like Thurmond, Watson was an open and unashamed segregationist. Both supported Barry Goldwater's campaign for President. While Watson headed the South Carolina "Democrats for Goldwater" organization, Thurmond went as far as switching parties and becoming a Republican on September 17, 1964. Partly because of his support for Goldwater, Watson was reelected without opposition as Goldwater carried South Carolina, the first Republican to have done so since Rutherford B. Hayes in 1876. The House Democratic Caucus stripped Watson of his seniority for supporting Goldwater. Another Deep South congressman, John Bell Williams of Mississippi, lost his seniority for supporting Goldwater as well. Declaring he would "not sit around and be bullied by northern liberals," Watson resigned from Congress on February 1, 1965. He then announced that he would run in the special election for his old seat on June 15, 1965—as a Republican.

Watson won the special election with 59.1 percent of the vote to become the first Republican to represent South Carolina in the House since 1896, and the first Republican to win a disputed House election in the state since Reconstruction. It was a different Republican Party in the South, however, as in 1965 most blacks in South Carolina were still effectively disenfranchised. Watson was comfortably reelected in 1966 and 1968. Watson's opposition to civil rights legislation exceeded that of most other Southern Republicans. For instance, he was the only House Republican to vote against the Jury Selection Act of 1968, a civil rights measure intended to eliminate racial discrimination in jury selection.

1970 gubernatorial election
In 1970, Watson opted not to run for reelection, instead announcing his candidacy for governor. As a measure of how weak the Republicans were in South Carolina for most of the post-Reconstruction era, in most elections since losing the governorship in 1892 they hadn't even fielded a candidate. He won the nomination with a major assist from Thurmond. He faced strong competition from the Democratic nominee, Lieutenant Governor John C. West, originally from Camden. State and national Republicans were somewhat cool toward Watson because of his obstinate support for segregation. The Civil Rights Act of 1964 was intended to end segregation, and enforcement of the Voting Rights Act of 1965 meant that African Americans were re-entering the political system. Not a single daily newspaper endorsed Watson for governor.

Hastings Wyman took leave from his position as an aide to Senator Thurmond to serve as Watson's campaign manager.

Racist politics

Gubernatorial campaign issues
Watson's running mate was James Marvin Henderson, Sr.

1970 election results
Official results gave West 251,151 votes (52.1 percent) to Watson's 221,236 (45.9 percent). Red Bethea of the American Independent Party polled 9,758 votes (2 percent).

African-American voters in 1970 numbered 206,394, or 46 percent of the African-American voting-age population and 35 percent of the total registration.

Historians consider Watson's gubernatorial campaign to be the last openly segregationist campaign in South Carolina and one of the last in the South as a whole. Watson was succeeded in the House by Spence, who had nearly won the seat in 1962. Spence went on to hold the seat for thirty years.

Later years
In 1971, Thurmond asked Nixon to appoint Albert Watson to the United States Court of Military Appeals, but Democratic U.S. Senator George McGovern of South Dakota opposed him. The next year McGovern became Nixon's general election opponent.

Watson died in Columbia at the age of seventy-two in 1994. He is interred there at Crescent Hill Memorial Gardens and Mausoleum.

See also

 List of members of the House Un-American Activities Committee
 List of United States representatives who switched parties

References

External links

1922 births
1994 deaths
University of South Carolina School of Law alumni
South Carolina lawyers
Republican Party members of the South Carolina House of Representatives
People from Sumter, South Carolina
Politicians from Columbia, South Carolina
Baptists from South Carolina
United States Army Air Forces soldiers
United States Army Air Forces personnel of World War II
Republican Party members of the United States House of Representatives from South Carolina
Democratic Party members of the United States House of Representatives from South Carolina
20th-century American lawyers
20th-century American politicians
Lawyers from Columbia, South Carolina
20th-century Baptists